The 1947 Purdue Boilermakers football team was an American football team that represented Purdue University during the 1947 Big Nine Conference football season.  In their first season under head coach Stu Holcomb, the Boilermakers compiled a 5–4 record, finished in tie for fourth place in the Big Ten Conference with a 3–3 record against conference opponents, and outscored opponents by a total of 205 to 130.

Notable players from the 1947 Purdue team included halfback Harry Szulborski and tackle Phil O'Reilly.

Schedule

Roster

Games summaries

Ohio State
Harry Szulborski 23 rushes, 172 yards

Boston University
Harry Szulborski 17 rushes, 166 yards

Iowa
Harry Szulborski 16 rushes, 134 yards

Minnesota
Norbert Adams 24 rushes, 138 yards

Pittsburgh
Harry Szulborski 15 rushes, 119 yards

References

Purdue
Purdue Boilermakers football seasons
Purdue Boilermakers football